The following is a list of buildings or locations that served as headquarters for General George Washington during the American Revolutionary War.

Background

On April 19, 1775, the militia of Massachusetts – later joined by the militias of other New England colonies – began a siege at Boston to prevent thousands of newly-arrived British troops from moving inland.
 
On June 14, 1775, the Second Continental Congress created a Continental Army, to be formed out of the individual militias of the Thirteen Colonies. The next day, Congress created the position of Commander-in-Chief of the Continental Army, and unanimously elected Washington to that position. Congress formally presented him with his commission on June 19, and he departed Philadelphia, Pennsylvania, on June 23, headed for Massachusetts. He arrived at Cambridge, Massachusetts, on July 2, and took command of the siege. It lasted until March 17, 1776, when the British withdrew by ship.

Washington's headquarters staff consisted of a military secretary – initially, Colonel Joseph Reed; and four aides-de-camp – initially, William Palfrey, Stephen Moylan, Richard Cary, and Robert Hanson Harrison. They managed Washington's correspondence, made copies of each day's General Orders (to be distributed to the commanding officer at each military post), and made copies of individual orders from the commander-in-chief.

Traveling with the headquarters staff (his "family") and a troop of life-guards (bodyguards), Washington tended to stay at military camps, taverns, houses belonging to Continental Army officers or sympathetic civilians, and vacant houses seized from Loyalists. Topography and geographical features were exploited to protect a headquarters—before and after the Battle of Germantown, Washington stayed at the Henry Keely House, atop a plateau on the west side of the Perkiomen Creek, while the Continental Army camped on the east side of the creek at Pennypacker Mills; between Washington and the British Army.

Washington's correspondence and expense accounts are useful sources for determining his location on a specific date. For instance: an expense account entry that lists meals – but not "use of house" – likely indicates that Washington and his staff pitched their tents on the owner's property.

Headquarters

See also
 List of George Washington articles

Citations

General sources 
 
 William Spohn Baker, Itinerary of General Washington from June 15, 1775, to December 23, 1783, (Philadelphia: J.B. Lippincott Company, 1892).
 Elijah Fisher's Journal while in the War for Independence, William B. Lapham, ed. (Augusta, Maine: Press of Badger and Manley, 1880). Fisher joined Washington's life-guards March 30, 1778, while at Valley Forge.
 Bernard Christian Steiner, The Life and Correspondence of James McHenry: Secretary of War under Washington and Adams (Burrow Brothers Company, 1907).

External links 
 
 Official Website: George Washington Witness Tree of Delaware Museum

American Revolution-related lists
Headquarters during the Revolutionary War
Continental Army